Jacques Chancel, (Joseph André Jacques Régis Crampes; 2 July 1928 – 23 December 2014) was a French journalist and writer. He was known for being the radio host of Radioscopie and Le Grand Échiquier for 22 years. Chancel was born in Ayzac-Ost, France.

Chancel died at his home in Paris from cancer, aged 86.

References

External links

1928 births
2014 deaths
Deaths from cancer in France
French television presenters
French radio presenters
People from Hautes-Pyrénées